Daniel Richard Livesey (born 31 December 1984) is a retired English professional footballer. A defender, he made 311 appearances in the Football League, with his longest period being a ten-year spell at Carlisle United. He has also played for Bolton Wanderers, Notts County, Blackpool, Wrexham, Barrow, Salford City and ended his career at Chester.

Club career

Bolton Wanderers
Livesey started his career at Bolton Wanderers, and made his league debut at the Reebok in a 3–2 defeat versus Liverpool at 17 (one of the youngest Premiership and Wanderers players ever). He only made one more league appearance and a couple of cup appearances, and joined Rochdale and Notts County on loan in 2003 and 2004, respectively. After this, he joined Blackpool on loan, but in his debut he suffered a serious injury and returned to the Trotters.

Carlisle United
On Christmas Eve 2004, Livesey signed for Carlisle United, who were then in the Conference and since joining has played a major part in the club's rise to League One and in August 2007, signed a contract extension until 2010. Livesey was named in the League One 2007–08 team of the year. He was also awarded the captaincy due to Paul Thirlwell's injury problems.
On 4 June 2012, Livesey signed a new 1-year deal with Carlisle United with the option of a further year.

In 2014, he was released.

Wrexham
On 31 January 2014, Livesey joined Wrexham on loan for the rest of the season.

Barrow
In 2014 Livesey signed for Barrow, helping the club to win the Conference North title on the final day of the 2014–15 season in a 3–2 win at Lowestoft Town. Following the departure of Simon Grand at the end of the 2015–16 season Livesey was made the club captain, but was released when his contract expired at the end of 2016–17.

Salford City
After this release from Barrow, he joined Salford City on a two-year contract.

Chester (loan)
On 26 July 2018 he joined Chester on a season-long loan along with fellow player Anthony Dudley, reuniting them with their former Salford managers.

At the end of the season, Chester confirmed both players had returned to their parent club.

Chester
In May 2019 it was confirmed that Livesey would join Chester on a one-year contract upon the expiration of his contract with Salford City on 1 July 2019. On 24 November 2021, following the departure of joint managers Anthony Johnson and Bernard Morley, UEFA B Licensed coach Livesey was placed in temporary charge of the team.

On 1 May 2022, Livesey confirmed that he would retire from football at the end of the 2021–22 season. He confirmed that he would be starting a job at a school in September 2022.

Career statistics

Honours
Carlisle United
Football League Two: 2005–06
Football League Trophy: 2010–11

Barrow
Conference North: 2014–15

Salford City
National League North: 2017–18

Individual
PFA Team of the Year: 2007–08 League One

References

External links

1984 births
Living people
Footballers from Salford
English footballers
Association football defenders
Bolton Wanderers F.C. players
Notts County F.C. players
Rochdale A.F.C. players
Blackpool F.C. players
Carlisle United F.C. players
Wrexham A.F.C. players
Barrow A.F.C. players
Premier League players
English Football League players
National League (English football) players
Salford City F.C. players
Chester F.C. players
Chester F.C. managers